Jalan Lencongan Timur, or Sungai Petani Eastern Bypass, Federal Route 225, is a major highway bypass in Sungai Petani, Kedah, Malaysia. The Kilometre Zero of the Federal Route 225 is located at Jalan Badlishah near Bedong, at its interchange with the Federal Route 1, the main trunk road of the central of Peninsular Malaysia.

Features
At most sections, the Federal Route 225 was built under the JKR R5 road standard, with a speed limit of 90 km/h.

List of junctions

References

See also
 Jalan Lencongan Barat

Highways in Malaysia
Sungai Petani Ring Road
Malaysian Federal Roads